Robert Teitel is an American film producer.

Teitel produced the films Soul Food (1997), Men of Honor (2000), and the three films in the Barbershop series: Barbershop, Barbershop 2: Back in Business, and Beauty Shop.  He also co-produced of the television series Barbershop: The Series.

A 1990 graduate of Columbia College Chicago, he has been associated with writer/director George Tillman Jr. since they were students there.

Filmography 
He was a producer in all films unless otherwise noted.

Film

As writer

Television

External links
Biography on the Soul Food movie website
Coverage of Men of Honor by Columbia Chronicle Online, including video interview with Teitel
 

American film producers
American television producers
Columbia College Chicago alumni
Living people
Year of birth missing (living people)